Sandra Marie Douglas (born 22 April 1967) is a female English former athlete who competed mainly in the 400 metres. She won a bronze medal in the 4 × 400 metres relay at the 1992 Barcelona Olympics.

Career
Douglas was born in Cheetham Hill, Manchester. She competed for Great Britain at the 1992 Summer Olympics held in Barcelona, Spain, where she ran her lifetime best of 51.41 secs to reach the semifinals of the 400 metres, before going on to win a bronze medal in the 4 x 400 metres relay, with her teammates Phyllis Smith, Jennifer Stoute and Sally Gunnell. Douglas also competed for England at the 1994 Commonwealth Games.

International competitions

National titles
UK Championships 400 metres (1992)
AAA Indoor Championships 400 metres (1991)

References

1967 births
Living people
People from Chipping Campden
Sportspeople from Gloucestershire
English female sprinters
Olympic athletes of Great Britain
Olympic bronze medallists for Great Britain
Athletes (track and field) at the 1992 Summer Olympics
Athletes (track and field) at the 1994 Commonwealth Games
Medalists at the 1992 Summer Olympics
Olympic bronze medalists in athletics (track and field)
Commonwealth Games competitors for England
Olympic female sprinters